The Cathedral of Almería, in full the Cathedral of the Incarnation of Almería, is a Roman Catholic cathedral in the city of Almería, Andalusia. It is the seat of the Diocese of Almería.

Description
The cathedral was built in Gothic and Renaissance architectural styles from 1524 to 1562. Its last bell was built in 1805.

It is considered Bien de Interés Cultural and was declared as a Monumento histórico-artístico perteneciente al Tesoro Artístico Nacional by the decree of the June 3, 1931.

On March 21, 1969, the cathedral was used as a scenery for the American film Patton.

References

External links 

 .

Buildings and structures in Almería
Almería
16th-century Roman Catholic church buildings in Spain
Roman Catholic churches completed in 1562
Gothic architecture in Andalusia
Renaissance architecture in Andalusia
1524 establishments in Spain
Bien de Interés Cultural landmarks in the Province of Almería